Donald Kemp (17 June 1929 – 17 July 1981) was a South African cricketer. He played in nine first-class matches for Border from 1951/52 to 1955/56.

See also
 List of Border representative cricketers

References

External links
 

1929 births
1981 deaths
South African cricketers
Border cricketers
People from Cathcart